The Upper Peace Region is a land-use framework region in northern Alberta, Canada. One of seven in the province, each is intended to develop and implement a regional plan, complementing the planning efforts of member municipalities in order to coordinate future growth. Corresponding roughly to major watersheds while following municipal boundaries, these regions are managed by Alberta Environment and Parks.

Communities

The following municipalities are contained in the Upper Peace Region.

 

Cities
Grande Prairie

Towns
 Beaverlodge
 Fairview
 Fox Creek
 Grimshaw
 McLennan
 Peace River
 Sexsmith
 Spirit River
 Valleyview
 Wembley

Villages
 Berwyn
 Donnelly
 Girouxville
 Hines Creek
 Hythe
 Rycroft

Municipal districts
 Birch Hills County
 Clear Hills County
 Municipal District of Fairview
 County of Grande Prairie
 Municipal District of Greenview
 Municipal District of Peace
 Municipal District of Smoky River
 Municipal District of Spirit River
 Saddle Hills County

Improvement districts
 Improvement District No. 25 (Willmore Wilderness)

Indian reserves
 Alexander 134A
 Clear Hills 152C
 Duncan's 151A
 Horse Lakes 152B
 Sturgeon Lake 154
 Sturgeon Lake 154A
 Sturgeon Lake 154B

References

Alberta land-use framework regions